Murat Karayılan (born 1954), also nicknamed Cemal, is one of the co-founders of the Kurdistan Workers' Party (PKK). He has been the organization PKK's acting leader since its original founder and leader, Abdullah Öcalan, was captured in 1999 by Turkish intelligence agents. On 2014, he left the PKK leader position and was assigned as the new commander-in-chief of the PKK's armed wing, the People's Defence Forces.

Born in Birecik, Şanlıurfa, Karayılan finished his studies at a vocational college of machinery and joined the organization PKK in 1979. He was active in his native province of Şanlıurfa until he fled to Syria at the time of the 1980 Turkish coup d'état. He has called on Kurds to stop serving in the military of Turkey, stop paying taxes and stop using the Turkish language.

On 13 December 2016, the Mardin 1st Criminal Court of Peace issued a detention warrant for Karayılan and Duran Kalkan, another PKK commander, as part of an investigation into the killing of the Kaymakam of Derik, Muhammet Fatih Safitürk.

In March 2017, there were reports of a failed assassination attempt against Karayılan, but it was unclear as to whether the attempt was made by Turkish forces or a group within the PKK.

Murat Karayılan and two other PKK leaders are wanted by the United States Department of the Treasury and the Government of Turkey for allegedly recruiting child soldiers, targeting Turkish government officials, police and security forces, and injuring and killing civilians within the Rewards for Justice Program.

Since 28 October 2015, he has been in the red category of the "most wanted terrorists" list published by the Ministry of Interior of the Republic of Turkey. The Ministry states that a reward of up to 10 million ₺ will be given to the person or persons who catch him or share information that will result in his arrest. 

Murat Karayilan is also the author of a book called Bir Savaşın Anatomisi  (Anatomy of War).

Suspicions of drug trafficking
On 14 October 2009, the U.S. Department of the Treasury's Office of Foreign Assets Control (OFAC) designated senior leaders of  the organisation PKK as significant foreign narcotics traffickers: Murat Karayılan, the head of  the PKK, and high-ranking members Ali Rıza Altun and Zübeyir Aydar. Pursuant to the Kingpin Act, the designation freezes any assets the three designees may have under U.S. jurisdiction and prohibits U.S. persons from conducting financial or commercial transactions with these individuals. As of 2011, Karayılan still has this designation.

The German Federal Office for the Protection of the Constitution stated in the same year, that it has no evidence that the organisational structures of the PKK are directly involved in drug trafficking in Germany.

References

External links
 

1954 births
Living people
People from Birecik
Turkish Kurdish people
Members of the Kurdistan Workers' Party
Turkish Kurdish politicians
Kurdish revolutionaries
Apoists
21st-century male writers
Kurdish independence activists
People charged with terrorism